Starogumerovo (İśke Ğümär) is a rural locality (a selo) and the administrative centre of Starogumerovsky Selsoviet, Kushnarenkovsky District, Bashkortostan, Russia. The population was 581 as of 2010. There are 8 streets.

Geography 
Starogumerovo is located 35 km south of Kushnarenkovo (the district's administrative centre) by road. Novoakbashevo is the nearest rural locality.

References 

Rural localities in Kushnarenkovsky District